This is a list of notable horror punk bands.

45 Grave
Aiden
AFI
Argyle Goolsby
Ashestoangels
Balzac
Blitzkid
Calabrese
Christian Death
Creeper
The Creepshow
The Cryptkeeper Five
Death Wolf
DieMonsterDie
Doyle
Dr. Chud's X-Ward
Energy
Flesh Roxon
Frankenstein Drag Queens From Planet 13
Gorgeous Frankenstein
Gotham Road
The Groovie Ghoulies
Haunted Garage
Misfits
Miss Vincent
Mister Monster
Mourning Noise
Murderdolls
Nekromantix
The Nerve Agents
Nim Vind
The Other
Our Time Down Here
Salem
Samhain
Schoolyard Heroes
Screaming Dead
Son of Sam
Stellar Corpses
Tiger Army
TSOL
The Undead
Wednesday 13
The Young Werewolves
Zombina and the Skeletones

References

External links
Horror 'n' Roll

Lists of punk bands